KGNS-TV (channel 8) is a television station in Laredo, Texas, United States, affiliated with NBC and ABC. It is owned by Gray Television alongside low-power dual CBS/CW+ affiliate KYLX-LD (channel 13) and Telemundo affiliate KXNU-LD (channel 10). The stations share studios on Del Mar Boulevard (near I-35) in northern Laredo, while KGNS-TV's transmitter is located northwest of the city.

History

KGNS originally went on air January 7, 1956 as KHAD-TV, it has been a primary NBC affiliate since its sign on, but the station initially held secondary affiliations with CBS and ABC. CBS programming moved to KVTV in December 1973 (it went dark in 2015) and ABC programming moved to present-day Univision affiliate KLDO-TV in December 1984, effectively making KGNS an exclusive NBC affiliate.

Donrey Media Group (now Stephens Media Group) bought the station on September 1, 1958. One of its first moves under Donrey ownership was to change the station's call letters, Donrey management held a contest in which elementary and middle school students from both the United States and Mexico sides of the Rio Grande region to choose a new callsign; the winning entry resulted in the station changing its callsign to the current KGNS-TV (standing for "Good Neighbor Station").

In 1985, KGNS was purchased by Century Development Corporation. In 1990 the station began a Spanish language newscast.

By 1998, KGNS gained a secondary affiliation with the United Paramount Network (UPN) lasting at least until 2000 while definitively off the station by 2004. then move to cable only on Time Warner Cable Channel 16. In 2000, the WB affiliate in the market was cable-only KTXW, and its successor network, the CW was carried on the .2 subchannel, which now carries ABC.

In April 2002, the Spanish news staff resigned from their jobs, forcing the station to initially run a sitcom, then replacing it with English language news.

In 2004, the station was purchased by SagamoreHill Broadcasting. The sale to SagamoreHill was approved by the Federal Communications Commission on December 1, 2005.

On January 24, 2006, The WB and CBS Corporation-owned UPN announced that the two networks would cease broadcasting and merge into a new broadcast network called The CW. On September 18, 2006, KGNS-TV rebranded "KTXW" Time Warner Cable channel 19 as The CW Laredo starting its CW programming. With the subsequent sign-on of digital subchannel 8.2, the subchannel began broadcasting "KTXW" bringing the channel over-the-air coverage throughout the market. In 2010, local Spanish language news returned to the station on Telemundo affiliated subchannel 3.

In May 2013, SagamoreHill Broadcasting reached a deal to sell KGNS, along with KGWN-TV in Cheyenne, Wyoming and KSTF in Scottsbluff, Nebraska, to Yellowstone Holdings, a subsidiary of Frontier Radio Management. On November 4, 2013, Gray Television announced a deal to acquire Yellowstone Holdings for $23 million. The sale was completed on December 31.

On November 6, 2013, KGNS-TV reached an agreement with the ABC television network to add the ABC affiliation, originally slated to launch February 2014 on channel 8.2. The ABC affiliation began on July 1, 2014, making The CW available in Laredo exclusively on Time Warner Cable via the national feed of The CW Plus; ABC network programming had been provided on cable via KSAT-TV or Corpus Christi affiliate KIII since KLDO-TV lost its ABC affiliation in 1988. The CW programming wouldn't be seen over the air in Laredo area until October 2015, as KYLX-LP picked up the affiliation.

Programming
Unlike most NBC stations in the Central Time Zone, KGNS-TV has aired NBC News Daily at 11:00 a.m. rather than the network's recommended 1:00 p.m. timeslot. Syndicated programming currently broadcast (as of September 2022) on KGNS includes Pictionary, The Drew Barrymore Show, Paternity Court, Impractical Jokers, Mike & Molly, The King of Queens, Access Hollywood, Pawn Stars, The Kelly Clarkson Show, Dr. Phil and Wheel of Fortune (Jeopardy!, usually paired with Wheel, instead airs on sister station KYLX-LD.)

KGNS-TV's second subchannel airs the rebroadcast of its 5:00 p.m. newscast at 5:30 p.m. As a result, it airs an alternate live feed of ABC World News Tonight at 6:00 p.m. unlike most ABC stations in the Central Time Zone. Syndicated programming currently broadcast (as of September 2021) on KGNS-DT2 includes The Big Bang Theory, 25 Words or Less, Entertainment Tonight, Young Sheldon, Divorce Court, Funny You Should Ask, Judge Mathis and The People's Court.

News operation
Since CBS affiliate KVTV shut down its news department in 2006, KGNS has operated the only English-language news department in the market. It currently airs three hours of newscasts every weekday and one hour per day on weekends. The station employs a number of recent college graduates. According to Nielsen Media Research, KGNS competes closely with Spanish-language station KLDO.

In 1990, the station began a Spanish language newscast at 5 p.m. called Noticias en Español with news anchor Hector Lerma. On April 29, 2002, the Spanish news staff resigned from the station forcing them to run a sitcom in that time slot. KGNS eventually replaced the Spanish news broadcast with English language news on March 1 of the following year. In 2010, local Spanish language news returned to the station on Telemundo affiliated subchannel 3. Initially, there was a Sunday morning show, Telemundo Laredo...En tu Casa then expanded on November 18, 2010 with a week night 10 PM show.

On June 21, 2008, KGNS-TV began producing a weeknight, 9 o'clock newscast on its CW-affiliated second digital subchannel titled Laredo's First News at 9. This program was the only prime time newscast in the Laredo-Nuevo Laredo market until Fox affiliate KXOF-CA launched a competing 9 p.m. newscast on April 9, 2012. The half-hour newscast is anchored by Brenda Medina and Ryan Bailey. This newscast was targeted at young adults between the ages of 21 and 34 years old.

Technical information

Subchannels
The station's digital signal is multiplexed:&.6

Analog-to-digital conversion
On April 8, 2004, KGNS-TV launched its digital signal on UHF channel 15, becoming the first television station in the Laredo market to operate a digital broadcast television signal. KGNS-TV discontinued Its analog signal and began broadcasting exclusively on a digital-only signal on June 12, 2009. The station vacated its pre-transition digital channel 15, and moved its digital channel allocation to its former analog VHF channel 8. KGNS-TV began broadcasting high-definition programming on its digital signal in October 2008.

See also
Channel 8 digital TV stations in the United States
Channel 8 virtual TV stations in the United States

References

External links

GNS-TV
Gray Television
NBC network affiliates
Telemundo network affiliates
Television channels and stations established in 1956
ABC network affiliates